Plinia salticola, commonly known as dwarf mulchi or dwarf cambucá, is a species of plant in the family Myrtaceae. The tree is endemic to Costa Rica and Ecuador, grows to between 1 and 1.5 metre tall, and produces edible orange fruits.

References

salticola
Crops originating from the Americas
Tropical fruit
Flora of South America
Fruits originating in South America
Cauliflory
Fruit trees
Berries
Plants described in 1963